WLRK may refer to:

 Wachtell, Lipton, Rosen & Katz, a prominent law firm
 WLRK (FM), a radio station (91.5 FM) licensed to Greenville, Mississippi, United States